Russell Dwayne Mark Leverock (born 14 July 1971) is a former Bermudian cricketer.

Living above an Indian restaurant in Bermuda, Leverock is a jailer. At the 2007 Cricket World Cup he was the largest player to grace the pitch, weighing in at 20 stone (280 pounds or 127 kg). However he is not regarded as the heaviest man to ever play in international cricket. West Indies right-arm off-break bowler Rahkeem Cornwall weighs over 140 kg and Warwick Armstrong weighed about 22 stone. His most memorable moment came during the group stage match against India, where he took a one handed stunning diving catch which became one of the talking points during the tournament and his catch was praised globally.

Playing career
Leverock played with the Bermudian cricket team in their first ever One Day International when they played Canada on 17 May 2006. Leverock claimed one of Canada's wickets as Bermuda won the game by three wickets under the Duckworth-Lewis method. He has since gone onto play for Bermuda in 11 ODIs, and picked up the first five wicket haul by a Bermudian bowler in ODIs, when he took 5/53 against Kenya which he achieved by opening the bowling, no mean feat for a spin bowler.

He has also represented Bermuda in all eight of their ICC Intercontinental Cup matches to date, with a best of 7/57 against the USA in 2004. He also played in the 2005 ICC Trophy, the ICC Americas Championship in 2004 and 2006, and in the 2006 Stanford 20/20.

As a batsman, Leverock made his first half-century (51) against the Netherlands in the 2006 ICC Intercontinental Cup, including 8 fours, and shared in a 132-run partnership with Glamorgan captain David Hemp. It was reported that he "enjoyed his time at the crease so much that he expressed dissent when he was given out lbw, and was consequently fined for the action.". He made his second half-century (also 51) against the Netherlands in the 2007–08 ICC Intercontinental Cup, which included some powerful straight fours.

2007 Cricket World Cup
In a warm up game against England, as preparation for the 2007 Cricket World Cup Leverock took the wickets of Paul Collingwood and notably Kevin Pietersen, his 10 over spell returning figures of 2 for 32 and resulting in Leverock attaining a cult following around the world. Leverock commented, "It was the first time I have played against a team like this. I settled into a rhythm, and when I settled, I took wickets. The wicket was turning a little bit". England captain Michael Vaughan was full of praise for Leverock's performance. "He bowled very well. Any spinner that drags Kevin Pietersen out of his crease, and does him in the flight, is a good bowler".

Against Sri Lanka, Leverock took the wicket of Sri Lanka wicket-keeper Kumar Sangakkara, but missed two opportunities to catch Sri Lanka captain, Mahela Jayawardene. Leverock's 10 overs cost 67 runs.

Leverock took a stunning, diving one-handed slip catch to dismiss Robin Uthappa off Malachi Jones' 1st ball in World Cup Cricket, (the 2nd over of the game) against India, which triggered off wild celebrations. Leverock also took the wicket of Yuvraj Singh and performed his trademark "jig" to celebrate. However, his 10 overs were expensive, going for 96 runs.

With the shock of the death of Bob Woolmer, British tabloid fury at Andrew Flintoff's drunken shenanigans and sub-continental unhappiness at underperforming superstars, Leverock became the feel-good hit of the 2007 Cricket World Cup.

Bermuda coach Gus Logie, the former West Indies international, is an admirer of left-arm spinner Leverock. "He's big and because of that he attracts a lot of attention, but it does not deter him," Logie says.

Dwayne's performances in the 2007 World Cup won him the Bermuda Sun Sports Personality of the Year for the second year running. Dwayne remarked that 2007 "has been a memorable year."

He also mentioned, "A lot of people do recognize me now, which surprised me. I noticed it most coming through Heathrow on our tour of Europe. English people, Indians, Sri Lankans, anyone who knew cricket seemed to recognize me."

"Quite a few came up and asked for a picture or an autograph, which is a nice feeling."

Retirement
Leverock announced his retirement from international cricket in April 2009 after Bermuda finished in a disappointing ninth place in the 2009 ICC World Cup Qualifier which resulted in the team losing its One Day International status and failing to qualify for the 2011 Cricket World Cup.

As Bermuda have played no One Day Internationals since, Leverock remains its highest aggregate wicket-taker in the format, and his 5/53 the best bowling figures recorded by a Bermudan bowler in the format.

Other sports
Leverock previously played football with Bermudian team Zebras, where he was a striker. Leverock also plays golf.

In his younger days, Leverock was a hurdler for Bermuda, and once won a silver medal in a youth games in the Caribbean.

References

External links

 Heavyweight performance from Leverock from International Herald Tribune
Cricinfo article
BBC Interview with Dwayne Leverock

1971 births
Living people
People from Hamilton, Bermuda
Bermudian cricketers
Bermuda One Day International cricketers
Bermuda Twenty20 International cricketers